Cerberus is a mythic multi-headed dog.

Cerberus may also refer to:

Astronomy
Cerberus (constellation), a group of stars
Cerberus (Martian albedo feature), a dark spot on Mars
Kerberos (moon), a moon of Pluto (sometimes mistakenly spelled Cerberus)
1865 Cerberus, an asteroid

Biology
 Cerberus (protein), involved in embryological development
 Cerberus (snake), a genus of snakes
 Cerberus (virus) (BQ.1.1), a variant of the SARS-CoV-2 Omicron virus variant

Art, entertainment, and media

Fictional entities
Cerberus (Cardcaptor Sakura), a character in the manga and anime series Cardcaptor Sakura
Cerberus (Eyeshield 21), a fictional dog in the manga and anime series Eyeshield 21
Cerberus (Mass Effect), a fictional anthropocentric organization in the video game franchise Mass Effect
Cerberus, a character and boss opponent in the video game Blood
Cerberus, a boss in the video game Devil May Cry 3: Dante's Awakening
Cerberus, a fictional zombie in the manga and anime series One Piece
Cerberus, a paradigm consisting of three Commandos (Attackers) in the video game Final Fantasy XIII and Final Fantasy XIII-2
Cerberus, a boss in the video game  Old School RuneScape
Cerberus, a fictional military system of the United States in the film Olympus Has Fallen
Cerberus, a fictional scientific project in the television series The 100
Cerberus, a fictional dog in British soap opera Coronation Street
Cerberus, a character in the video game Helltaker

Works
Cerberus (film), a science fiction movie
Cerberus (board game), a 1979 science fiction board game
Cerebus the Aardvark, a comic book series
"Cerberus", an Amon Duul II song from the album Yeti
"Cerberus", a 2021 single by Pentagon

Military
HMAS Cerberus, Victoria, an Australian naval base
HMS Cerberus, one of various Royal Navy ships
HMVS Cerberus, an 1871 warship under various British Commonwealth aegises
Operation Cerberus, German codename for a World War II naval engagement in the English Channel 
Project Cerberus, an airborne early warning capability on Royal Navy Westland Sea King helicopters

Technology
Cerberus (sonar), a diver detection device
Cerberus FTP Server, file transfer software
Cerberus ticketing system, an issue tracking system

Other uses
Cerberus Capital Management, a private equity investment firm

See also
Kerberos (disambiguation)

fr:Cerbère (homonymie)